Alexander Osborne (born May 4, 1987) is an American rower. He competed in the men's quadruple sculls event at the 2012 Summer Olympics in London.

References

External links
 
 

1987 births
Living people
American male rowers
Olympic rowers of the United States
Rowers at the 2012 Summer Olympics
Sportspeople from Los Angeles